Saint Alexander of Comana (died c. 251), known as "the charcoal burner", was Bishop of Comana in Pontus.  Whether he was the first to occupy that see is unknown. The saint's curious name comes from the fact that he had, out of humility, taken up the work of burning charcoal, so as to escape worldly honors. He was noted for being exceptionally dirty in consequence.

He was called a philosopher, but it is not certain that the term can be taken literally. His philosophy consisted rather in his preference for heavenly rather than earthly things. The discovery of his virtues was accidental and due to the contempt with which he was widely regarded. St. Gregory Thaumaturgus had been asked to come to Comana to help select a bishop for that place. As he rejected all the candidates someone suggested derisively that he might accept Alexander, the charcoal-burner. Gregory took the suggestion seriously, summoned Alexander, and found that he had to do with a saintly man of great capabilities. Alexander was made bishop of the see, and administered it with wisdom. He was burned to death in the persecution carried out by Decius.

Alexander would have been unknown were it not for a discourse by St. Gregory of Nyssa, on the life of St. Gregory Thaumaturgus, in which the election of Alexander is incidentally described. 

His feast day is kept on August 11 by Roman Catholics, and on August 12 among Orthodox Christians.

References

External links
Santiebeati: Alexander of Comana
August 12th in the "Prologue of Ohrid" - includes the life of Saint Alexander of Comana and a hymn of praise

Sources

Saints from Roman Anatolia
251 deaths
3rd-century bishops in Roman Anatolia
3rd-century Christian saints
Year of birth unknown